"The Rocking Carol", also known as "Little Jesus, Sweetly Sleep" and "Rocking", is an English Christmas carol by Percy Dearmer. It was translated from Czech (Hajej, nynej) in 1928 and is performed as a lullaby to the baby Jesus. The carol has also been known in English as the "Rocking" carol since an American edition in 1963. The carol has been recorded by Julie Andrews, Roger Whittaker and other artists.

History 

The carol was first published in an anthology in 1920 in Czechoslovakia, where it was described as a traditional Czech carol. It was loosely translated into English by Percy Dearmer, as part of his effort of resurrecting hymns that had fallen into disuse and introducing European hymns into the Church of England. The carol is sung in the form of a lullaby to Jesus while rocking the manger as if it were a more modern cradle, as noted by the repetitive chorus of "We will rock you". It was first published in The Oxford Book of Carols, which Dearmer had edited alongside Martin Shaw and Ralph Vaughan Williams, in 1928.

After initial publication, the carol gradually decreased in popularity until the 1960s when the English actress Julie Andrews performed a commercially released version of it. Following this, it was published in Carols for Choirs by David Willcocks and John Rutter.

Description 

"The Rocking Carol" consists of two verses with eight lines each. It is performed with a 10.7.8.8.7.7 metre. The hymn continues to be published within Church of England and Anglican hymnals. The hymn has been described as the quintessential lullaby carol compared with similar wording lullaby Christmas carols of "Silent Night" and "Away in a Manger" as hymnologists opine that the lyrics and melody both strongly suggest the rocking of a cradle.

Lyrics
In Czech, the lyrics commence: "Hajej, nynej, Ježíšku, půjčíme ti kožíšku. Budeme tě kolébati, abys moh' libě pospati. Hajej, nynej, miláčku, Mariánský synáčku."

Little Jesus, sweetly sleep, do not stir;
We will lend a coat of fur,
We will rock you, rock you, rock you,
We will rock you, rock you, rock you.
See the fur to keep you warm,
Sungly round your tiny form.

Criticism
After publication, the final line of the carol met with dissatisfaction, with a number of hymnal editors altering it from "Darling, darling little man" to "Son of God and Son of Man". Critics of "The Rocking Carol" have argued that it has only minor Biblical references and is written without theological context and historical precision.

See also
 List of Christmas carols

References 

Christmas carols
1920 songs